Manasi Naik is an Indian dancer and actress in the Marathi film industry. She is known for her performance in the Marathi film song "Baghtoy Rikshawala" and in movies like Murder Mestri.

Naik was scheduled to perform a dance to the song "Bai Vadyavar Ya" in the 2016 Marathi comedy film Jalsa. This song is a tribute to legendary Marathi actor Nilu Phule. It is composed by Sameer Saptiskar, choreographed by Rajesh Bidve and sung by Anand Shinde.

Personal life 
She married boxer Pardeep Kharera in January 2021.

Filmography 

|2022
|Tu Fakt Ho Mhan
|Unnamed
|Special appearance in the song "Zhingnag Chiknang hotay"

Television

References

External links 

 

Living people
Indian film actresses
Indian television actresses
Actresses from Pune
21st-century Indian actresses
Marathi actors
Actresses in Marathi cinema
Actresses in Hindi cinema
1987 births